FC Belenergostroy Beloozyorsk was a Belarusian football club based in Beloozyorsk, Brest Oblast.

History
The team was founded in 1994 as FC Beloozyorsk and joined Belarusian Second League the same year. After three seasons the team was promoted to the First League was renamed to Belenergostroy Beloozyorsk after their main sponsor. Belenergostroy spent 2 seasons in the First League, and after finishing at the last, 16th place in 1998 the team was disbanded due to financial troubles. The amateur team holding the name FC Beloozyorsk is currently playing in Brest Voblast championship.

External links
Profile at footballfacts

Defunct football clubs in Belarus
1994 establishments in Belarus
1998 disestablishments in Belarus
Association football clubs established in 1994
Association football clubs disestablished in 1998